The 9th European Men's and Women's Artistic Gymnastics Individual Championships were held from 21–25 April 2021 at St. Jakobshalle in Basel, Switzerland. The 2021 European Championships were an Olympic qualifying event, with two individual spots available for both disciplines. Russia earned a non-nominative quota spot in both disciplines, while Turkey's Adem Asil and Romania's Larisa Iordache qualified nominative berths for themselves in men's and women's artistic gymnastics, respectively.

The original qualifiers, the 2020 European Men's and 2020 European Women's Championships, were undesignated as such in light of the COVID-19 pandemic in Europe. 

Several members of the German women's team chose to compete in full body leotards – a move that, while always allowed, has been considered risky and/or controversial in the past – to make the gymnasts more comfortable while competing, as well as address and deter sexualization of the sport.

Schedule 
All times in local time (UTC+02:00).

Wednesday, 21 April 2021
10:00 – 20:30 WAG Qualifying

Thursday, 22 April 2021
10:00 – 19:40 MAG Qualifying

Friday, 23 April 2021
13:30 – 15:30 WAG All-Around Final
17:15 – 20:00 MAG All-Around Final

Saturday, 24 April 2021
13:30 – 16:10 Apparatus Finals Day 1

Sunday, 25 April 2021
13:00 – 15:40 Apparatus Finals Day 2

Medals summary

Medalists

Medal standings

Overall

Men

Women

Men's results

Individual all-around 
Oldest and youngest competitors

Floor 

Oldest and youngest competitors

Pommel horse 

Oldest and youngest competitors

Rings 

Oldest and youngest competitors

Vault 
Oldest and youngest competitors

Parallel bars 

Oldest and youngest competitors

Horizontal bar 

Oldest and youngest competitors

Women's results

Individual all-around 
Oldest and youngest competitors

Vault 
Oldest and youngest competitors

Uneven bars 
Oldest and youngest competitors

Balance beam 
Oldest and youngest competitors

Floor 
Oldest and youngest competitors

Qualification

Men's results

Individual all-around 
Russia earned a non-nominative quota spot, and Turkey's Adem Asil secured a nominative quota spot for the 2020 Summer Olympics.

Floor

Pommel horse

Rings

Vault

Parallel bars

Horizontal bar

Women's results

Individual all-around 
Russia earned a non-nominative quota spot, and Romania's Larisa Iordache secured a nominative quota spot for the 2020 Summer Olympics.

Vault

Uneven bars

Balance beam

Floor

References

External links 
 
 2021 European Artistic Gymnastics Championships at European Gymnastics
 2021 European Artistic Gymnastics Championships at Fédération Internationale de Gymnastique

European Artistic Gymnastics Championships
European Artistic Gymnastics Championships
2021 in Swiss sport
European Artistic Gymnastics Championships
International gymnastics competitions hosted by Switzerland
Sports competitions in Basel